De Macedo may refer to:

 Édouard de Macedo (c.1900–1965), Brazilian founder of France scouting
 Evaristo de Macedo (born 1933), Brazilian footballer
 Joaquim Manuel de Macedo (1820–1882), author
 José Agostinho de Macedo (1761–1831), Portuguese poet and prose writer
 José Monteiro de Macedo (born 1982), Guinea-Bissauan football defender
 Lota de Macedo Soares (1910–1967), Brazilian aesthete
 Leandro Netto de Macedo (born 1979), Brazilian football player
 João Afonso da Costa de Sousa de Macedo (1815–1890), 1st duke of Albuquerque
 Vinny deMacedo (born 1965), Cape Verdean American politician

See also 

 Macedo

De Macedo